Gmina Brzeźnica may refer to either of the following rural administrative districts in Poland:
Gmina Brzeźnica, Lesser Poland Voivodeship
Gmina Brzeźnica, Lubusz Voivodeship